The Slovak Central Mountains are a group of mountain ranges in southern central Slovakia. The town of Zvolen lies roughly in the centre of the mountains.

The Slovak Central Mountains are a part of the Inner Western Carpathians. They are bordered by the Fatra-Tatra Area to the northwest and north, Slovak Ore Mountains (Slovenské rudohorie) to the east, Southern Slovak Basin (Juhoslovenská kotlina) to the south and by the Pannonian Plain to the southwest.

The Slovak Central Mountains are divided into the following subdivisions:

Vtacnik Mountains 
Pohronský Inovec
Štiavnica Mountains 
Kremnica Mountains 
Poľana
Ostrôžky
Javorie
Krupina Plain
Zvolen Basin
Pliešovce Basin (Pliešovská kotlina)
Žiar Basin

The highest mountain is Poľana at 1,458 m.

References

Mountain ranges of Slovakia
Mountain ranges of the Western Carpathians